Rolf Beeler is a Swiss affineur known for his raw milk artisan cheeses. He does not make cheese himself but collects terroir-based cheeses from small artisanal cheesemakers and then ages them to create the final product.

Career
Prior to becoming a cheese specialist, Rolf Beeler was a school teacher and DJ. He opened his own grocery store, where he sold products he liked. Beeler sold his store and started to work directly with cheese makers abroad, including French cheesemaker Bernard Antony.

Beeler turned his house basement into a small cheese cellar and started to age and ripen his favourite cheeses, which he bought from small local producers. Restaurateurs liked his cheeses, the business went up and soon there was not enough space to stock all the wheels of cheese at his house. Later, he came up with a new strategy: he allowed the cheese to ripen at the cheese makers' cellars and educated them on how to handle the process of ripening, visiting them at least once a week to check the product and discuss the further steps of aging.

After succeeding in production of traditional Swiss cheeses, Beeler started to develop new cheese recipes in collaboration with his fellow cheesemakers, wine-washed Hoch Ybrig being the first of many.

World distribution

By the end of the 1990s, Beeler decided to expand to foreign markets and introduced his Sélection Rolf Beeler at the Slow Food Fair Salone del Gusto in Turin, Italy in 1998. Today his Sélection contains eighteen aged raw milk cheeses and can be found on the menus of more than 120 top restaurants in Germany, England, Switzerland, Scandinavia, USA and Australia.

Awards

 Toggenburger Sélection Rolf Beeler won gold medal at World Cheese Award 2009 held in Gran Canaria
 Jersey Blue by Willi Schmid won gold medal at 2010 World Jersey Cheese Awards
 Max McCalman rated 186 cheese in his book “Cheese: A Connoisseur's Guide to the World's Best”, 17 of the top 30 are from Rolf Beeler with the top spot going to Beeler's Sbrinz

Further reading
 Max McCalman, 2005. Cheese: A Connoisseur's Guide to the World's Best, 304 pages, 
 Flammer, Dominik; Scheffold, Fabian, 2010. "Swiss cheese: origins, traditional cheese varieties and new creations", 343 pages,

References

People in food and agriculture occupations
Swiss businesspeople
Living people
Year of birth missing (living people)
Cheesemakers